James Henry Champion (January 11, 1926 – January 15, 1987) was an American gridiron football player and coach.

A graduate of Mississippi State University, Champion spent two seasons as a linebacker and offensive and defensive tackle for the New York Yanks of the National Football League (NFL).

After his playing career, Champion became head football coach Greenwood High School in Greenwood, Mississippi. After three seasons in Greenwood, he returned to Mississippi State as line coach. 
 
From 1962 to 1965, Champion was a defensive coach with the BC Lions. After spending one season as an assistant with the St. Louis Cardinals, he returned to the Lions, this time as head coach. Champion was fired during the 1969 season after a 1–9 start.

Following his dismissal, Champion served as an assistant with the New Orleans Saints, St. Louis Cardinals, New York Jets, and Atlanta Falcons before his retirement after the 1979 season. He returned to coaching on an interim basis in 1980 after the resignation of Green Bay Packers defensive line coach Fred von Appen. Champion spent the rest of the season with the Packers, but was not brought back for the 1981 season.

Head coaching record

References

1926 births
1987 deaths
Atlanta Falcons coaches
BC Lions coaches
Green Bay Packers coaches
Mississippi State Bulldogs football coaches
Mississippi State Bulldogs football players
New Orleans Saints coaches
New York Jets coaches
New York Yanks players
St. Louis Cardinals (football) coaches
People from Yalobusha County, Mississippi
Players of American football from Mississippi
National Football League defensive coordinators